Arun Banks is a  biological Site of Special Scientific Interest north of Arundel in West Sussex.

This site consists of a tidal stretch of the River Arun and a cut-off meander loop. The diverse flora includes reed sweet grass, sea club-rush and glaucous bulrush. The river banks have wet grassland, scrub, woodland and drainage ditches with tall fen.

References

Sites of Special Scientific Interest in West Sussex